Sternotomis andrewesi is a species of beetle in the family Cerambycidae. It was described by Stephan von Breuning in 1935.

References

Sternotomini
Beetles described in 1935